Roniel Iglesias Sotolongo (born 14 August 1988) is a Cuban boxer, best known for winning the junior world title at lightweight in 2006, a bronze medal  at the 2008 Summer Olympics in Beijing and a gold at the 2012 Summer Olympics in London. He went on to add to his already impressive Olympic resume by winning another gold medal at the 2020 Summer Olympics in Tokyo at 33-years-old.

Career
In 2005, Iglesias won the national (senior) flyweight title as a 16-year-old when Olympic champion Yuriorkis Gamboa was out injured.  He beat future two-time champ Yoandri Salinas and then Karel Luis in the final.  However, the more experienced Andry Laffita who had competed at junior flyweight was sent to the world championships.

In 2006, he competed in January at the national (senior) championships at bantamweight and lost in the semifinal to Idel Torriente, in September he had put on 6 more kilograms and won the 2006 world title at lightweight in Agadir, Morocco. In the quarterfinals he beat Éverton Lopes and then Kazach Azamat Smagulov in the final.

In 2008 he won the junior welter national senior championship, he beat Richard Poll 12:9 in the final and was sent to the Olympic qualifier in Trinidad where he beat another teenager Javier Molina in the semifinal to qualify for the 2008 Summer Olympics where he lost his semi to defending champion Manus Boonjumnong.

In the 2012 Olympic Games in London, Iglesias won the gold medal by defeating Denys Berinchyk from Ukraine by a score of 22-15.

He later moved up to welterweight, which was the weight division he competed in at the 2016 Summer Olympics. In the 2020 Olympic Games in Tokyo, Iglesias won a gold medal by defeating Pat McCormack from Great Britain by a score of 5–0.

Results
Beijing 2008 Olympic results
Defeated Mahaman Smaila (Cameroon) 15-1
Defeated Driss Moussaid (Morocco) 15-4
Defeated Gennady Kovalev (Russia) 5-2
Lost to Manus Boonjumnong (Thailand) 5-10
London 2012 Olympic results
Defeated Cesar Villarraga Aldana (Colombia) 20-9
Defeated Everton Dos Santos Lopes (Brazil) 18-15
Defeated Uktamjon Rahmonov (Uzbekistan) 21-15
Defeated Vincenzo Mangiacapre (Italy) 15-8
Defeated Denys Berinchyk (Ukraine) 22-15
Rio 2016 Olympic results
Defeated Vladimir Margaryan (Armenia) TKO
Lost to Shakhram Giyasov (Uzbekistan) 3-0
Tokyo 2020 Olympic results
Defeated Sewon Okazawa (Japan) 3–2
Defeated Delante Johnson (USA) 5–0
Defeated Andrey Zamkovoy (Russia) 5–0
Defeated Pat McCormack (Great Britain) 5–0

References

External links
 
 
 
 Nationals 2008, Spanish

1988 births
Living people
People from Pinar del Río
Cuban male boxers
Olympic boxers of Cuba
Olympic bronze medalists for Cuba
Olympic medalists in boxing
Olympic gold medalists for Cuba
Boxers at the 2008 Summer Olympics
Boxers at the 2011 Pan American Games
Boxers at the 2012 Summer Olympics
Boxers at the 2015 Pan American Games
Boxers at the 2016 Summer Olympics
Boxers at the 2019 Pan American Games
Boxers at the 2020 Summer Olympics
Medalists at the 2012 Summer Olympics
Medalists at the 2008 Summer Olympics
Medalists at the 2020 Summer Olympics
Pan American Games gold medalists for Cuba
Pan American Games silver medalists for Cuba
Pan American Games medalists in boxing
Central American and Caribbean Games gold medalists for Cuba
Competitors at the 2014 Central American and Caribbean Games
Competitors at the 2018 Central American and Caribbean Games
AIBA World Boxing Championships medalists
Welterweight boxers
Central American and Caribbean Games medalists in boxing
Medalists at the 2011 Pan American Games
Medalists at the 2015 Pan American Games
Medalists at the 2019 Pan American Games
21st-century Cuban people